Honda Motor Company v. Oberg, 512 U.S. 415 (1994), was a United States Supreme Court case in which the Court held that an amendment to the Oregon state constitution disallowing judicial review of the size of punitive damages was a violation of due process.

Decision
In a products liability action, Honda was found liable for injuries received by the plaintiff in an ATV accident.  Honda was liable for a $5 million punitive damage award, and both the state appellate court and the Oregon Supreme Court declined to review the award for excessiveness based on an amendment to the Oregon constitution.  The Supreme Court of United States held that the amendment to the Oregon constitution violated due process.  The Court held that judicial review of punitive damage awards for excessiveness was a long-standing common law tradition that was critical in protecting against arbitrary deprivations of property, and that Oregon had not instituted a substitute procedure to maintain these protections.

See also
 Geier v. American Honda Motor Company
 List of United States Supreme Court cases, volume 512

References

External links
 

United States Supreme Court cases
1994 in United States case law
United States tort case law
ATVs
Honda
United States Supreme Court cases of the Rehnquist Court